John Picard may refer to:
 John Picard (architect)
 John Picard (musician)
 John M. Picard, mayor of West Haven, Connecticut

See also
 John Pickard (disambiguation)